No Funny Business is a 1933 British comedy film directed by Victor Hanbury and starring Laurence Olivier, Gertrude Lawrence, Jill Esmond and Edmund Breon. The film is a comedy of errors set in a divorce case. It was made at Ealing Studios. The film's sets were designed by the art director Duncan Sutherland. Olivier had returned to Britain after his career, following an initial move to Hollywood, had faltered.

Cast
 Gertrude Lawrence as Yvonne
 Laurence Olivier as Clive Dering
 Jill Esmond as Anne
 Edmund Breon as Edward
 Gibb McLaughlin as Florey
 Muriel Aked as Mrs Fothergill

References

Bibliography
 Munn, Michael. Lord Larry: The Secret Life of Laurence Olivier. Robson Books, 2007.

1933 films
1933 comedy films
British comedy films
Films shot at Imperial Studios, Elstree
United Artists films
Films directed by Victor Hanbury
British black-and-white films
1930s English-language films
1930s British films